Bagh is a census town in Dhar district  in the state of Madhya Pradesh, India. It is known for the Bagh Caves, which are late 4th- to 6th-century Buddhist rock-cut chambers with murals. The name of the town stems from the caves - according to local legend there were living tigers (bagh in several languages of India) in these abandoned Buddhist caves.

History 

In 1982, a hoard of 27 inscriptions issued by the Maharajas of Valkha was discovered at Risawala near Bagh. The inscriptions were issued from a place known as Valkha, which has led to suggestions that the name "Bagh" is derived from "Valkha". The inscriptions are dated to the years 38-134 of an unspecified calendar era. Historians D. C. Sircar and R. C. Majumdar theorized that the Maharajas of Valkha were subordinates to the Guptas, and the calendar era used in their inscription is the Gupta era starting from 319 CE. Thus, the Maharajas of Valkha can be dated to 4th and 5th centuries CE.

The next known ruler of the region is Maharaja Subandhu of Mahishmati. His Bagh Caves inscription is dated 167 (486 CE, assuming Gupta era). Art historian Walter M. Spink has identified Subandhu as the prince Vishruta mentioned in Dashakumaracharita. According to his theory, Subandhu or Vishruta was a Gupta prince, who established the dynasty that later came to be known as Kalachuri.

Transport Connectivity

By Train

Nearest Railway stations are Dahod 100 km., Indore 150 km., Meghnagar 104 km., Ratlam 150 km, Khandwa 220 km.

By Road

Bagh is well connected to Indore by road and Daily Bus Services.

By airport
The nearest airport is Indore.

Bagh Printing 
The Khatris are a community whose inward beings dance the Sufi way. They came under the influence of a Sufi man and it stuck a long lasting chord. Originally Ajrakh printers they ventured into places to sell their fabrics and their enterprising ways kept them upfloat. From Larkana in Sind (today's Pakistan) to Pali, to the Marwadi Thar, to Manawar in Madhya Pradesh, their journey came to a stop and they settled down in Bagh in 1962, as they saw their grandfather and uncles returning to their ancestral land (Karachi, Pakistan) during Partition

It has an average elevation of 240 metres (787 feet).

Demographics
 India census, Bagh had a population of 7415. Males constitute 51% of the population and females 49%. Bagh has an average literacy rate of 63%, higher than the national average of 59.5%; with 57% of the males and 43% of females literate. 16% of the population is under 6 years of age.

Education

Mahesh Memorial Public Higher Secondary School, Bagh

Notable people from Bagh
Abdul Kadar Khatri (1961 - 2019) Master Craftsman
 Mohammed Yusuf Khatri, printer

References

Bibliography 

 
 
 
 

Cities and towns in Dhar district
Buddhist caves in India